Dose or Dosage may refer to:

Music
 Dose (Gov't Mule album), 1998
 Dose (Latin Playboys album)
 Dosage (album), by the band Collective Soul
 "Dose" (song), a 2018 song by Ciara 
 "Dose", song by Filter from the album Short Bus

Science
 Dose (biochemistry), a measured quantity of a medicine, nutrient, or pathogen which is delivered as a unit.
 Dosage form, a mixture of active and inactive components used to administer a medication
 Dosing, feeding chemicals or medicines when used in small quantities
 Effective dose (pharmacology), a dose or concentration of a drug that produces a biological response
Absorbed dose, a measure of energy deposited in matter from ionizing radiation 
Equivalent dose, a measure of cancer/heritable health risk in tissue from ionizing radiation
Effective dose (radiation), a measure of cancer/heritable health risk to the whole body from ionizing radiation
Median lethal dose, a measure of the lethal dose of a chemical agent, toxin, adiation, or pathogen

Other
 Dosa or dose, a thin pancake or crepe originating from South India
 Dose (magazine), a free daily Canadian magazine
 Döse, town in Lower Saxony, Germany
 Gerd Dose (1942–2010), professor of English literature at the University of Hamburg

See also
 Double Dose (disambiguation)
 Effective dose (disambiguation)
 Overdose (disambiguation)